David Ricardo Cervantes Peredo (8 November 1959 – 18 June 2022) was a Mexican politician. A member of the Party of the Democratic Revolution, he served in the Chamber of Deputies from 1997 to 2000 and previously served in the Legislative Assembly of the Federal District.

Cervantes died on 18 June 2022 at the age of 62.

References

1959 births
2022 deaths
Morena (political party) politicians
Party of the Democratic Revolution politicians
Members of the Chamber of Deputies (Mexico)
Deputies of the LVII Legislature of Mexico
Members of the Congress of Mexico City
20th-century Mexican politicians
National Autonomous University of Mexico alumni